Theatrix may refer to:
Theatrix, a role-playing game
Theatrix Interactive, an educational software company

See also
Theatrics